Hopkins High School is a public high school located in Minnetonka, Minnesota, United States. Minnetonka is a southwestern suburb of Minneapolis. It offers classes for grades 10, 11, and 12, making it one of the only schools in the state still with a 10–12 alignment.  Hopkins High School is part of the Hopkins School District 270 and draws students from the city of Hopkins, central and eastern parts of Minnetonka, western Edina, northern Eden Prairie, Golden Valley, western St. Louis Park, and southern Plymouth. (Minnetonka High School draws students from western Minnetonka.) Hopkins High School is known for their dominance in both Boys and Girls Basketball, having won a combined 16 State Championships from years 2002–2022.

History
In the 1970s, there were two high schools in the district: Dwight D. Eisenhower Senior High School, named for the former general and U.S. president and Charles A. Lindbergh Senior High School named for the Minnesota native and famed aviator. In 1982, Hopkins closed Eisenhower High School, located in a 1950s-era building along Highway 7, and renamed the remaining school Hopkins Senior High School. The older building was converted to a community center and theater. Later part of the building was converted for use as an elementary school.

In 2003, voters approved a $60 million bond, permitting the construction of a  addition to the high school, consisting of a new auditorium, cafeteria and classrooms. Two years later, the Hopkins School District was declared in statutory operating debt by the State of Minnesota. Many support staff were laid off and class sizes increased by more than 30%. In 2007–08 school year, the statutory label was removed.

Academics 
Hopkins High School was Minnesota's first National School of Excellence. In 1996, Hopkins was the only high school in Minnesota honored for overall excellence in Redbook's "America's Best High Schools" project. The Language Arts Department has been named a "Center for Excellence" by the National Council of Teachers of English in recognition of the writing program. The Community Involvement program is one of six in the nation honored by the IBM Corporation and U.S. News & World Report. U.S. News & World Report also ranked the school #628 in their 2012 list of best public high schools in America.

Hopkins High School participates in the Advanced Placement Program. In 2005, 494 students took 751 AP exams, with 77% scoring 3 or higher. Students' mean SAT score of 1170 is well above national average, as is the mean ACT score of 23.9. Six teachers are consultants for the College Board and lead workshops and grade national exams.

Since 1998, the school has had 84 National Merit Semifinalists and 141 Commended Scholars.

Hopkins is also home to KHOP-TV which produces both weekly shows and cable programming, a school dance program called the Royelles, a Hip-Hop dance team named Deeply Royal, as well as a Student Government and school newspaper- The Royal Page

Athletics 
Hopkins High School is a member of the Lake Conference of the Minnesota State High School League.

State championships

 – from 1933 to 1994 an overall team champion was calculated with a point system involving the scores achieved by schools results in all three events – Cross Country, Slalom, and Ski Jumping. In each event, the school with the two best scores was declared the team champion in that event

Notable alumni 

Stefon Leron Alexander – rapper/musician known as P.O.S and member of Doomtree collective
Travis Boyd – NHL player 
Paige Bueckers – basketball player, UConn Huskies and multiple USA national youth teams
Amir Coffey – basketball player, Minnesota Golden Gophers, Los Angeles Clippers.
Andrew Dawson – Grammy Award-winning music producer and engineer
Joseph Fahnbulleh –  Liberian sprinter, attended the 2020 Tokyo Olympics and placed 5th in the men's 200m final. 
LeRoy Gardner III – national champion wrestler, (2001 and 2003)
Joan Guetschow – Olympic athlete (1985 graduate)
Holly Henry – Musician and former The Voice (U.S. TV series) contestant
Kris Humphries – NBA basketball player, Atlanta Hawks, Washington Wizards, New Jersey Nets
Alexander Johnson – figure skater
Kathryn Johnson – U.S. rugby player, 2016 Olympics Rugby 7s 
Jo Ling Kent – news reporter
Brian Klaas – Political scientist and author
Jim Korn – NHL player (1980–1990)
Garrott Kuzzy – 2010 Olympic cross country skier
Lazerbeak – rapper/musician and member of Doomtree collective
Michael Lehan – football player, Cleveland Browns cornerback (2003–2005), Miami Dolphins (2006–2008)
Mike Mictlan – rapper/musician and member of Doomtree collective
Zeke Nnaji – basketball player, Arizona Wildcats, Denver Nuggets
Cecil Otter – rapper/musician and member of Doomtree collective
Jeffrey Lee Parson – apprehended by FBI for creating MSBlast. B computer virus in 2003
Ryan Schreiber – founded Pitchfork Media and Pitchfork Music Festival
Sims (rapper) – rapper/musician and member of Doomtree collective
Dave Snuggerud – NHL player (1987–1990)
Nadine Strossen – president of American Civil Liberties Union (1991–2008). Hopkins debater.
Todd Sklar – filmmaker, Box Elder, Awful Nice
Paper Tiger – rapper/musician and member of Doomtree collective
Royce White – basketball player (Houston Rockets) and political activist
Joe Klecker - Professional runner and 2021 Olympian
Courtney Dauwalter - Ultramarathon runner

References

External links

Official website

Public high schools in Minnesota
Educational institutions established in 1980
1980 establishments in Minnesota
Schools in Hennepin County, Minnesota